The 2013 World Kabaddi Cup was the fourth edition of the circle style World Kabaddi Cup, held from 1 to 14 December 2013 with the Opening Ceremony on 30 November 2013 at Bathinda. The tournament took place in Punjab, India.

Organization

The tournament was organized by the Government of Punjab, India. The dates of the tournament were first announced publicly on 12 July 2013. Approving of the 20 crore budget for the 4th World Cup Kabaddi, the opening and closing ceremonies were telecast live throughout the country, with international broadcasting in Canada, the United States, India and the United Kingdom.

Participating nations
The 14-day-long event had 11 participating nations in the men's tournament, with 8 participating nations in the women's tournament.

Men's tournament 
 
 
 
 
 DNP
 
 
 
 
 
 
 
DNP Did not play.

Venues
The games played at the following venues.
 Guru Nanak Stadium, Amritsar
 Multi-Purpose Sports Stadium, Bathinda
 Sports Stadium, Jalalabad, Fazilka
 Government College Stadium, Gurdaspur
 Lajwanti Stadium, Hoshiarpur
 Guru Gobind Singh Stadium, Jalandhar
 Guru Nanak Stadium, Ludhiana
 N.M. Government College Stadium, Mansa
 Yadvindra Public School Stadium, Patiala
 Nehru Stadium, Rupnagar
 War Heroes Stadium, Sangrur
 Sen. Sec. School Stadium, Doda, Sri Muktsar Sahib
 Guru Arjun Dev Sports Stadium, Chohla Sahib, Tarn Taran

Opening ceremony
Opening Ceremony was held at Bathinda. Many Celebrities Of Cinema of Punjab and Bollywood Performed at this mega event. Those who performed were actress Priyanka Chopra, Gippy Grewal, Sharry Mann and Miss Pooja.

Closing ceremony
Closing Ceremony was held at Ludhiana. Chief Minister of Punjab, Pakistan Mian Shahbaz Sharif was the chief guest for the ceremony. Many Indian and Pakistani Celebrities Of Cinema of Punjab and Bollywood performed at this mega event like actor Ranveer Singh, Fariha Pervez, Bir Khalsa Gatka Group, Master Saleem, Prince Dance Group, Lakhwinder Wadali, Roshan Prince, Jaspinder Narula. There was interruption in Jaspinder Narula's Performance by young supporter of Bhai Gurbaksh Singh Khalsa who is on Hunger strike for release of Sikh Prisoners who have completed their full terms in jail and not even released yet.

Schedule
Note: All matches' timings are according to Indian Standard Time (UTC +5:30).

Group stage

Pool A

 Qualified for semifinals

Pool B

 Qualified for semifinals

Knockout stage

Semi-finals

Third place

Final match

Women's tournament

Schedule
Note: All matches' timings are according to Indian Standard Time (UTC +5:30).

Group stage

Pool A

 Qualified for semifinals

Pool B

 Qualified for semifinals

Knockout stage

Semi-finals

Third place

Final match

Doping
Issuing strict instructions for ensuring dope free tournament, he said that every participant player would have to undergo dope test as prescribed by NADA and sanctioned Rs 100 crore budget for it.

Song
On 14 November 2013, prominent actor/director Harpreet Sandhu (Actor) release a song based on Kabaddi world cup called 2013 
World Cup sung by Dilbag Brar and produced by ArtGauge Films Inc.

Broadcasting 
Television

References 

Kabaddi World Cup
Kabaddi competitions in India
2013 in Indian sport